https://www.ouirganeguide.com/ 
Ouirganene is a small town and rural commune in Al Haouz Province of the Marrakesh-Tensift-El Haouz region of Morocco. At the time of the 2004 census, the commune had a total population of 6916 people living in 1281 households. It is a Berber village.

Geography
The Oued Nfis River flows through the valley of the commune. The village itself lies on the eastern bank of the reservoir and barrage which dams the Oued Nfis river. The village is set amongst olive trees.

Landmarks
Ouirgane has a souq noted for its Berber pottery the Tin Mal Mosque, a ruined kasbah, and several salt mines in the vicinity. There are also two notable hotels with facing gardens; a stream near the hotels "drains the western face of Jbel Toubkal". La Roseraie hotel has horse-riding facilities to accommodate the many tourists who visit during the summer months; it also has a health center above the mineral stream. The Auberge au Sanglier qui Fume is a hunter's lodge.

References

Populated places in Al Haouz Province
Rural communes of Marrakesh-Safi